The Staats House, also known as the General Baron von Steuben Headquarters, is a historic building located at 17 Von Steuben Lane in South Bound Brook, Somerset County, New Jersey. Constructed , it is now known as the Abraham Staats House after its second owner. In 1779, during the second Middlebrook encampment of the American Revolutionary War, it served as the headquarters for Prussian-American General Friedrich Wilhelm von Steuben. The house was added to the National Register of Historic Places on December 4, 2002, and noted as representing "one of the finest remaining buildings from the second phase of Dutch immigration and settlement in the Raritan Valley".

History
In 1740, Hendrick Staats was granted the farm from his father, Peter Staats, who was from Brooklyn. In 1769, Hendrick gave the property to his brother John Staats (1713–1781). John then transferred it to his son Abraham Staats (1743–1821) in November 1770. After Abraham and his wife died, the property was divided between their son Issac Staats and his five sisters.

Revolutionary War
At the Battle of Bound Brook, on April 13, 1777, private property was taken during the raid by British forces. Staats filed a detailed report in 1782, which included several animals, wheat, and clothing.

Von Steuben, who had been appointed Inspector General of the Continental Army by Congress on May 5, 1778, arrived at the Staats House on March 26, 1779, during the second Middlebrook encampment. During the Valley Forge encampment, he had begun work on the Regulations for the Order and Discipline of the Troops of the United States, which was approved by Congress on March 29.

On May 2, 1779, a review of the army was held to honor the French minister Conrad Alexandre Gérard de Rayneval and the Spanish diplomat Juan de Miralles. Led by General William Smallwood, four battalions performed precise military formations to demonstrate their mastery of von Steuben's training. After the review, about sixty generals and colonels attended a dinner hosted by von Steuben in a large tent near the house. Here Gérard told General George Washington that Comte d'Estaing's fleet would assist him in the war and that supplies from France would be increased.

Gallery

See also
Other houses used as headquarters during the second Middlebrook encampment (1778–79):
 Wallace House – General George Washington
 Van Horne House – General William Alexander, Lord Stirling
 Van Veghten House – General Nathanael Greene
 Jacobus Vanderveer House – General Henry Knox

References

External links
 
 
 
 
  Abraham Staats House
 

National Register of Historic Places in Somerset County, New Jersey
Houses on the National Register of Historic Places in New Jersey
Federal architecture in New Jersey
South Bound Brook, New Jersey
Houses in Somerset County, New Jersey
New Jersey Register of Historic Places
Historic American Buildings Survey in New Jersey
American Revolution on the National Register of Historic Places
New Jersey in the American Revolution
Houses completed in 1740
Colonial architecture in New Jersey